The Hawthorne Public Schools are a comprehensive community public school district that serves students in pre-kindergarten through twelfth grade from Hawthorne, in Passaic County, New Jersey, United States.

As of the 2018–19 school year, the district, comprised of five schools, had an enrollment of 2,323 students and 200.8 classroom teachers (on an FTE basis), for a student–teacher ratio of 11.6:1.

The district is classified by the New Jersey Department of Education as being in District Factor Group "DE", the fifth-highest of eight groupings. District Factor Groups organize districts statewide to allow comparison by common socioeconomic characteristics of the local districts. From lowest socioeconomic status to highest, the categories are A, B, CD, DE, FG, GH, I and J.

Awards and recognition
Jefferson Elementary School received the National Blue Ribbon Award for Excellence in the 2011-12 school year.

Schools
Schools in the district (with 2018–19 enrollment data from the National Center for Education Statistics) are:

Elementary schools
Jefferson Elementary School (288 students; in grades PK-5)
Stephen Droske, Principal
Roosevelt Elementary School (523; K-5)
Joseph Pisacane, Principal
Washington Elementary School (270; K-5)
Susan Spinelli, Principal
Middle school
Lincoln Middle School (521; 6-8)
Erin Devor, Principal
High school
Hawthorne High School (688; 9-12)
Thomas DeMaio (interim), Principal

Administration
Core members of the district's administration are:
Richard A. Spirito, Superintendent
Trude Engle, Business Administrator / Board Secretary

Board of education
The district's board of education, comprised of nine members, sets policy and oversees the fiscal and educational operation of the district through its administration. As a Type II school district, the board's trustees are elected directly by voters to serve three-year terms of office on a staggered basis, with three seats up for election each year held (since 2014) as part of the November general election. The board appoints a superintendent to oversee the district's day-to-day operations and a business administrator to supervise the business functions of the district.

References

External links

 
School Data for the Hawthorne Public Schools, National Center for Education Statistics

Hawthorne, New Jersey
New Jersey District Factor Group DE
School districts in Passaic County, New Jersey